Jean-Maurice Demarquet (20 August 1923 – 26 September 1989) was a French politician. He served as a member of the National Assembly from 1956 to 1958, representing Finistère.

References

1923 births
1989 deaths
People from Martigues
Politicians from Provence-Alpes-Côte d'Azur
Union for the Defense of Tradesmen and Artisans politicians
Deputies of the 3rd National Assembly of the French Fourth Republic